Stolen Paradise (Spanish: Paraíso robado) is a 1951 Mexican drama film directed by Julio Bracho and starring Arturo de Córdova, Irasema Dilián and María Douglas.

Cast
 Arturo de Córdova as Doctor Carlos de la Vega  
 Irasema Dilián as Marcela  
 María Douglas as Lucia  
 Charles Rooner as Don Gustavo 
 Ramón Gay as Julio Solorzano  
 Juan Orraca as Inspector romero  
 Enrique Díaz 'Indiano' as Doctor Silva  
 Jesús Valero as Cura  
 Mariano Requena
 Luisa Rooner as Abuela de Marcela

References

Bibliography 
 Celestino Gorostiza. Teatro completo. Univ. J. Autónoma de Tabasco, 2004.

External links 
 

1951 films
1951 drama films
Mexican drama films
1950s Spanish-language films
Films directed by Julio Bracho
Mexican black-and-white films
1950s Mexican films